

Cydia is a large genus of tortrix moths, belonging to the tribe Grapholitini of subfamily Olethreutinae. Its distinctness from and delimitation versus the tribe's type genus Grapholita requires further study.

Moths in this genus are generally small and dull brown; their caterpillars are yellow or white and wormlike. Cydia includes many species of economic importance due to the damage their caterpillars inflict as pests of agricultural crops, especially fruit and nut trees. On the other hand, some Cydia species have been used for biological control of invasive weeds, and many of these small moths and their caterpillars are an important food source for other animals. A few species from the Hawaiian Islands are suspected to be extinct due to disappearance of their food plants.

Another well-known species is the jumping bean moth (C. saltitans), whose caterpillars live in Sebastiania seeds, turning them into the famous "Mexican jumping beans".

Species
Roughly 215 species are currently recognized in Cydia, though as noted above, the list is provisional:

 Cydia acerivora (Danilevsky in Danilevsky & Kuznetsov, 1968)
 Cydia adenocarpi (Ragonot, 1875)
 Cydia alabastrina Diakonoff, 1983
 Cydia alazon (Diakonoff, 1976)
 Cydia albimaculana (Fernald, 1879)
 Cydia albipicta (Sauter, 1968)
 Cydia alienana (Caradja, 1916)
 Cydia americana (Walsingham, 1879)
 Cydia amplana – rusty oak moth
 Cydia amurensis (Danilevsky in Danilevsky & Kuznetsov, 1968)
 Cydia anaranjada – slash pine seedworm moth
 Cydia aphrosema Diakonoff, 1987
 Cydia aphrospila (Meyrick, 1921)
 Cydia araucariae (Pastrana, 1951)
 Cydia archaeochrysa Diakonoff, 1986
 Cydia astragalana (Staudinger, 1871)
 Cydia atlantica Chambon & Frérot, 1985
 Cydia blackmoreana (Walsingham, 1903)
 Cydia bracteatana (Fernald in Comstock, 1881)
 Cydia brownorum Rose & Pooni, 2003
 Cydia callizona (Meyrick, 1911)
 Cydia canariensis (Kuznetzov, 1972)
 Cydia candana (Forbes, 1923)
 Cydia caradjana (Rebel, 1910)
 Cydia caryana – hickory shuckworm moth
 Cydia celiae (Clarke, 1976)
 Cydia charops (Diakonoff, 1971)
 Cydia chelias (Meyrick, 1907)
 Cydia chlorostola (possibly extinct)
 Cydia cognatana (Barrett, 1874)
 Cydia colorana Kearfott, 1907
 Cydia commensalana (Danilevsky, 1963)
 Cydia confusana (McDunnough, 1935)
 Cydia conicolana (Heylaerts, 1874)
 Cydia coniferana (Saxesen in Ratzeburg, 1840)
 Cydia conoterma (Meyrick, 1922)
 Cydia conspicua 
 Cydia cornucopiae (Tengstrom, 1869)
 Cydia corollana (Hübner, [1823])
 Cydia cosmophorana
 Cydia costastrigulana (McDunnough, 1935)
 Cydia crassicornis (possibly extinct)
 Cydia cryptomeriae (Issiki in Issiki & Mutuura, 1961)
 Cydia cupressana Kearfott, 1907
 Cydia curiosa Razowski, 2009
 Cydia curitibana Schönherr, 1987
 Cydia curvivalva Liu & Yan, 1998
 Cydia cytisanthana Burmann & Pröse, 1988
 Cydia dadionopa (Diakonoff, 1976)
 Cydia daedalota (Meyrick, 1916)
 Cydia dalbergiacola Liu, 1992
 Cydia damascana (Razowski, 1966)
 Cydia danilevskyi (Kuznetzov, 1973)
 Cydia defensa (Meyrick, 1922)
 Cydia derrai Pröse, 1988
 Cydia deyana (Chrétien, 1915)
 Cydia dissulta Diakonoff, 1983
 Cydia dochmasima Diakonoff, 1987
 Cydia doria (Clarke, 1976)
 Cydia duplicana
 Cydia elpore (Diakonoff, 1976)
 Cydia ergoda Razowski, 2013
 Cydia ermolenkoi (Danilevsky in Danilevsky & Kuznetsov, 1968)
 Cydia erotella (Heinrich, 1923)
 Cydia ethelinda (Meyrick, 1934)
 Cydia eucyanea Walsingham, 1914
 Cydia eudesma Walsingham, 1914
 Cydia exquisitana (Rebel, 1889)
 Cydia fabivora (Meyrick, 1928)
 Cydia fagiglandana – beech moth
 Cydia fahlbergiana (Thunberg, 1797)
 Cydia falsifalcellum
 Cydia farsica (Kuznetzov in Danilevsky & Kuznetsov, 1968)
 Cydia fletcherana (Kearfott, 1907)
 Cydia flexiloqua (Heinrich, 1926)
 Cydia gallaesaliciana (Riley, 1881)
 Cydia garacana (Kearfott, 1907)
 Cydia gilviciliana (Staudinger, 1859)
 Cydia glandicolana
 Cydia grandicula (Heinrich, 1926)
 Cydia grunertiana (Ratzeburg, 1868)
 Cydia guttifera (Meyrick, 1913)
 Cydia gypsograpta (possibly extinct)
 Cydia honorana (Herrich-Schffer, 1851)
 Cydia hygrotrema (Diakonoff, 1971)
 Cydia ilipulana (Walsingham, 1903)
 Cydia illustrana (Kuznetzov in Ler, 1986)
 Cydia illutana
 Cydia indivisa
 Cydia infausta (Walsingham, 1900)
 Cydia inflata (Meyrick, 1916)
 Cydia informosana (Walker, 1863)
 Cydia ingens – longleaf pine seedworm moth
 Cydia ingrata (Heinrich, 1926)
 Cydia injectiva (Heinrich, 1926)
 Cydia inopiosa (Heinrich, 1926)
 Cydia inquinatana
 Cydia interscindana (Möschler, 1866)
 Cydia intexta (Kawabe, 1980)
 Cydia japonensis Kawabe, 1980
 Cydia johanssoni Aarvik & Karsholt, 1993
 Cydia kamijoi (Oku, 1968)
 Cydia kozlovi (Kuznetzov, 1962)
 Cydia kurokoi – nut fruit tortrix
 Cydia lacustrina (Miller, 1976)
 Cydia lajonquierei (Capuse, 1970)
 Cydia largo Heppner, 1981
 Cydia laricana (Busck, 1916)
 Cydia laricicolana (Kuznetzov, 1960)
 Cydia larimana (Walsingham, 1895)
 Cydia latifemoris
 Cydia latiferreana – filbertworm moth (sometimes separated in Melissopus)
 Cydia latisigna Miller, 1986
 Cydia lautiuscula (Heinrich, 1926)
 Cydia leguminana (Lienig & Zeller, 1846)
 Cydia leucobasis (Busck, 1916)
 Cydia leucogrammana (Hofmann, 1898)
 Cydia leucostoma – tea flush worm
 Cydia maackiana (Danilevsky, 1963)
 Cydia malesana (Meyrick, 1920)
 Cydia marathonana Pröse & Sutter, 1973
 Cydia maxima (Kuznetzov, 1973)
 Cydia medicaginis – alfalfa moth
 Cydia mediocris (Kuznetzov, 1972)
 Cydia melanoptycha Diakonoff, 1983
 Cydia membrosa (Heinrich, 1926)
 Cydia menoides Walsingham, 1914
 Cydia microgrammana (Guenée, 1845)
 Cydia millenniana – larch gall moth
 Cydia miscitata (Heinrich, 1926)
 Cydia montana
 Cydia montezuma Miller, 1986
 Cydia monticola (Kuznetzov, 1962)
 Cydia multilineana (Kearfott, 1907)
 Cydia multistriana (Chrétien, 1915)
 Cydia nebulocula (Diakonoff, 1976)
 Cydia negatana (Rebel in Rebel & Rogenhofer, 1896)
 Cydia neolopha (Meyrick, 1926)
 Cydia nigra (Miller, 1966)
 Cydia nigricana – pea moth
 Cydia ninana Dyar, 1903
 Cydia nomaea (Meyrick, 1917)
 Cydia obliqua (may belong in C. plicatum)
 Cydia obnisa (Heinrich, 1926)
 Cydia obtecta (Meyrick, 1922)
 Cydia obumbrana Kuznetzov, 1992
 Cydia odontica Diakonoff, 1983
 Cydia omana Razowski, 1995
 Cydia oxytropidis (Martini, 1912)
 Cydia pactolana – spruce bark tortrix
 Cydia palmetum (Heinrich, 1928)
 Cydia pamira (Obraztsov, 1943)
 Cydia parapteryx
 Cydia peiui (Stanoiu & Neme, 1974)
 Cydia pentalychna (Meyrick in Caradja & Meyrick, 1938)
 Cydia perelegans (Kuznetzov, 1962)
 Cydia perfricta (Meyrick, 1920)
 Cydia periclydonia Diakonoff, 1983
 Cydia perlaeta Walsingham, 1914
 Cydia perrupta (Meyrick, 1922)
 Cydia persica (Kuznetzov in Danilevsky & Kuznetsov, 1968)
 Cydia phalacris (Meyrick, 1912)
 Cydia phyllisi Miller, 1986
 Cydia piperana – ponderosa pine seedworm moth
 Cydia plicatum (may include C. obliqua, C. storeella)
 Cydia plumbiferana (Staudinger, 1871)
 Cydia pomonella – codling moth
 Cydia populana (Busck, 1916)
 Cydia prismatica (Meyrick, 1911)
 Cydia prosperana (Kearfott, 1907)
 Cydia pseudomalesana Clarke, 1986
 Cydia pseudotsugae (Evans, 1969)
 Cydia pulchella Durrant in Walsingham, 1914
 Cydia pycnochra (Meyrick, 1920)
 Cydia pyraspis (Meyrick, 1928)
 Cydia pyrivora – pear fruit moth, pear tortricid
 Cydia rana (Forbes, 1924)
 Cydia reflectrix (Meyrick, 1928)
 Cydia rhodaspis (Meyrick, 1928)
 Cydia rjabovi (Kuznetzov, 1962)
 Cydia rufipennis
 Cydia saltitans – jumping bean moth
 Cydia sammuti Diakonoff, 1986
 Cydia secretana (Kuznetzov, 1973)
 Cydia seductana (Kuznetzov, 1962)
 Cydia semicinctana (Kennel, 1901)
 Cydia servillana (Duponchel in Godart, 1836)
 Cydia siderocosma (Diakonoff, 1969)
 Cydia signifer Walsingham, 1914
 Cydia silvana (Kuznetzov, 1970)
 Cydia splendana – chestnut tortrix, acorn moth
 Cydia staphiditis (Meyrick, 1930)
 Cydia stirpicola (Meyrick, 1926)
 Cydia storeella (possibly extinct or belongs in C. plicatum)
 Cydia striatana (Caradja, 1916)
 Cydia strigulatana (Kennel, 1899)
 Cydia strobilella – spruce seed moth
 Cydia succedana
 Cydia sumptuosana (Rebel in Rebel & Zerny, 1928)
 Cydia tana (Kearfott, 1907)
 Cydia taocosma (Meyrick, 1914)
 Cydia tonosticha (Meyrick, 1922)
 Cydia toreuta – eastern pine seedworm moth
 Cydia torostoma (Clarke, 1972)
 Cydia trasias (Meyrick, 1928)
 Cydia trichota Diakonoff, 1988
 Cydia trifascicolana Schönherr, 1987
 Cydia trogodana Pröse, 1988
 Cydia tropicana Kuznetzov, 1992
 Cydia tunisiana Aarvik & Karsholt, 1993
 Cydia turcianae Chambon in Chambon, Witzgall & Bengtsson, 1993
 Cydia ulicetana
 Cydia undosa (Diakonoff, 1957)
 Cydia uranatma (Meyrick, 1936)
 Cydia vallesiaca (Sauter, 1968)
 Cydia walsinghamii
 Cydia zebeana – larch bark moth

Former species
 Cydia euryteles (Meyrick, 1936)

Synonyms
Obsolete scientific names (junior synonyms and others) of Cydia are:

 Adenoneura Walsingham, 1907
 Carpocampa Harris, 1841 (unjustified emendation)
 Carpocapsa Treitschke, 1829
 Cerata Stephens, 1852
 Coccyx Treitschke, 1829
 Collicularia Obraztsov, 1960
 Crobilophora (lapsus)
 Crobylophora Kennel, 1910 (non Meyrick, 1880: preoccupied)
 Danilevskia Kuznetzov, 1970
 Dicraniana Diakonoff, 1984
 Erminea Kirby & Spence, 1826
 Erminia (lapsus)
 Hedulia Heinrich, 1926
 Kenneliola Paclt, 1951
 Lasperesia (lapsus)
 Laspeyresia Hübner, 1825 (non R.L., 1817: preoccupied)
 Lespeyresia (lapsus)
 Melisopus (lapsus)
 Melissopus Riley, 1882
 Melliopus (lapsus)
 Mellisopus (lapsus)
 Mellissopus (lapsus)
 Phanetoprepa Obraztsov, 1968
 Pseudotomoides Obraztsov, 1959
 Semasia Stephens, 1829
 Strobila Sodoffsky, 1837 (non Sars, 1829: preoccupied)

In addition to the uncertain relationship of Cydia and Grapholita already mentioned above, the synonymy of the present genus has been subject to some confusion with its close relative Pammene: Eucelis, Trycheris and Orchemia are sometimes  listed as junior synonyms of Cydia, but the type species of the former two is Tortrix mediana (a junior synonym of P. aurana), and that of the third is Orchemia gallicana (a junior synonym of P. gallicana).

References

External links
 Hawaiian Cydia
 Photos and descriptions of species
 Eurasian Cydia of Economic Importance

Grapholitini
Tortricidae genera
Taxa named by Jacob Hübner
Insect pests of millets